is a Japanese professional golfer who won the 2019 Women's British Open.

Early years 
Shibuno was born in Okayama, Japan on 15 November 1998. Her father was a discus thrower and her mother was a javelin thrower. She is the middle child of their three daughters.

She started playing golf and softball when she was a second grader. As a softball player, she was a pitcher and a converted left-handed hitter. As a golfer, she finished third in the 2010 Okayama Prefecture Junior Golf Championship (4th, 5th, and 6th grader division).

At Jōtō junior high school, she joined the school's baseball club as the only female player. However, after winning the 2011 Okayama Prefecture Junior Golf Championship (junior high school division), she decided to focus on golf, taking advice from her baseball coach.

In 2014, she was enrolled at Sakuyō High School where she continued to play golf for the school. In the same year, she won the Chūgoku Region Women's Amateur Championship. As a member of the school team, she won the team competition in the National High School Golf Championship in 2015.

Professional career 
In 2017, after graduating from the high school, she was qualified to take a final test to be a professional but failed.

In 2018, she mainly played in the step-up tour circuit. The only JLPGA competition she played in that year was the Earth Mondahmin Cup in June where she was qualified after a successful Monday qualifier. She scored a hole-in-one at the 9th hole of the first day of the competition and earned 6 million yen for the feat, despite missing the cut.

In July 2018, she passed the test and turned professional.

In May 2019, Shibuno won the World Ladies Championship Salonpas Cup, one of the four major golf tournaments for women on the LPGA of Japan Tour. In July 2019, she won the Shiseido Anessa Ladies Open after a playoff.

In August 2019, she won the AIG Women's British Open, which was her first LPGA Tour event and her first time outside of Japan. She is the second Japanese player to win a women's major championship, after Hisako Higuchi, who won the 1977 LPGA Championship, as well as the second player this decade to win in her major debut, after Kim Hyo-joo at the 2014 Evian Championship.

Shibuno earned her card for the 2022 LPGA Tour through qualifying school.

Professional wins (7)

LPGA Tour wins (1)

^ Co-sanctioned with the Ladies European Tour

LPGA of Japan Tour wins (6)

Tournaments in bold denotes major tournaments in LPGA of Japan Tour.

Major championships

Wins (1)

Results timeline

CUT = missed the half-way cut
NT = No tournament
"T" = tied

Summary

 Most consecutive cuts made – 3 (twice)
 Longest streak of top-10s – 1 (four times)

LPGA Tour career summary

^ Official as of 2022 season 
*Includes matchplay and other tournaments without a cut.

World ranking
Position in Women's World Golf Rankings at the end of each calendar year.

References

External links

Japanese female golfers
LPGA of Japan Tour golfers
LPGA Tour golfers
Winners of LPGA major golf championships
Sportspeople from Okayama
1998 births
Living people
21st-century Japanese women